A Bundt cake is a cake that is baked in a Bundt pan, shaping it into a distinctive doughnut shape. The style of mold in North America was popularized in the 1950s and 1960s, after cookware manufacturer Nordic Ware trademarked the name "Bundt" and began producing Bundt pans from cast aluminum. Publicity from Pillsbury saw the cakes gain widespread popularity.

Etymology

The Bundt cake derives in part from a European brioche-like cake called .

Opinions differ as to the significance of the word . One possibility is that it means "bunch" or "bundle", and refers to the way the dough is bundled around the tubed center of the pan. Another source suggests that it describes the banded appearance given to the cake by the fluted sides of the pan, similar to a tied sheaf or bundle of wheat. Some authors have suggested that  instead refers to a group of people, and that  is so called because of its suitability for parties and gatherings.

Uses of the word bund outside of Europe to describe cakes can be found in Jewish-American cookbooks from around the start of the 20th century. The alternative spelling "bundte" also appears in a recipe as early as 1901.

Design

Bundt cakes do not conform to any single recipe; instead, their characterizing feature is their shape. A Bundt pan generally has fluted or grooved sides, and is usually coated to make releasing the cake easier. Like other tube or ring style pans, the central tube allows faster and more even heat distribution when baking large volumes of batter.  

Ring pans like Bundt molds heat faster than regular round pans and they bake deep cakes evenly even at diameters over 9 inches. Usually heating cores are recommended for even heat distribution in deep cake tins and standard cakes larger than 9 inches in diameter. To bake in standard sized tins bundt recipes need conversion. A standard 9 inch cake pan holds around six cups volume, so a 12 cups Bundt recipe will fill two standard cake pans, or one 13x9 sheet pan.

Gugelhupf molds also have fluted sides, while other ring shaped molds like tube pans and  savarin have straight sides to make releasing delicate fine crumb cakes like angel food cake easier. Since the name "Bundt" is a trademark, similar pans are often sold as "fluted tube pans" or given other similar descriptive titles. The trademark holder Nordic Ware produces Bundt pans only in aluminum, but similar fluted pans are available in other materials.

Despite the similar shape, a  differs from contemporary Bundt-style cakes in that it follows a particular yeast-based recipe, with fruit and nuts, and is often deeper in shape and more decorative. Other yeasted, brioche-like cakes like babka, monkey bread can be baked in Bundt molds. Today, Bundt pans are also used to bake modernized cake batters and boxed mixes with baking powder, and can be used to mold gelatin salad, ice cream and even savory molded dishes like meatloaf.

Rise to popularity

The people credited with popularizing the Bundt cake are American businessman H. David Dalquist and his brother Mark S. Dalquist, who co-founded cookware company Nordic Ware based in St. Louis Park, Minnesota. In the late 1940s, Rose Joshua and Fannie Schanfield, friends and members of the Minneapolis Jewish-American Hadassah Society approached Dalquist asking if he could produce a modern version of a traditional cast iron  dish. Dalquist and company engineer Don Nygren designed a cast aluminum version which Nordic Ware then made a small production run of in 1950.  In order to successfully trademark the pans, a "t" was added to the word "Bund". A number of the original Bundt pans now reside in the Smithsonian collection.

Initially, the Bundt pan sold so poorly that Nordic Ware considered discontinuing it. The product received a boost when it was mentioned in the New Good Housekeeping Cookbook in 1963, but did not gain real popularity until 1966, when a Bundt cake called the "Tunnel of Fudge", baked by Ella Helfrich, took second place at the annual Pillsbury Bake-Off and won its baker $5,000. The resulting publicity resulted in more than 200,000 requests to Pillsbury for Bundt pans and soon led to the Bundt pan surpassing the tin Jell-O mold as the most-sold pan in the United States. In the 1970s Pillsbury licensed the name Bundt from Nordic Ware and for a while sold a range of Bundt cake mixes.

To date more than 60 million Bundt pans have been sold by Nordic Ware across North America. November 15 has been named "National Bundt Day".

See also
Angel food cake, an American sponge cake normally baked in a tube shaped pan
Gugelhupf, Austrian, German, and Swiss version with a similar shape
Wonder Pot, a stovetop pot which uses a similar design

References

External links 
 
 

Cakes
Cookware and bakeware
European American culture in Minnesota